Idiodes siculoides is a moth species of the subfamily Ennominae that occurs in Australia.

References
 

Lithinini
Moths of Australia
Moths described in 1860